Carl (or Karl) Lange (30 October 1909 – 23 June 1999) was a German film actor. He appeared in more than 70 films between 1954 and 1985. He was born in Flensburg, Germany and died in Ostfildern, Germany.

Partial filmography

 Ernst Thälmann (1954) - Zweiter Arbeiter
 Der Stern von Afrika (1957) - Hauptmann Krusenberg
 The Devil Strikes at Night (1957) - Major Thomas Wollenberg
 Doctor Crippen Lives (1958) - Aristide Coq, Buchhändler
  (1958) - Grossunternehmer Harald Flint
 Der Schinderhannes (1958) - Priester
 Christine (1958) - (uncredited)
 Stalingrad: Dogs, Do You Want to Live Forever? (1959) - General von Seydlitz
 Der Frosch mit der Maske (1959) - John Bennet 
 The Forests Sing Forever (1959) - Mr. von Gall
 Darkness Fell on Gotenhafen (1960) - Kapitän Zahn
 Mistress of the World (1960) - Berakov
 Soldatensender Calais (1960) - Hauptmann Reßler, Abwehr-Offizier
 The Inheritance of Bjorndal (1960) - Mr. von Gall
 Die Brücke des Schicksals (1960) - Chefredakteur
  (1960) - Generalmajor Modersohn
 Bankraub in der Rue Latour (1961) - Regisseur Bergström
 Girl from Hong Kong (1961) - Knut Ohlsen
 Barbara (1961) - Amtmann Heyde
 Der Teppich des Grauens (1962) - Colonel Gregory
 Der Prozeß Carl von O. (1964, TV Movie) - Heinz Jäger
 Waiting Room to the Beyond (1964) - Crantor
 Der Hexer (1964) - Reverend Hopkins
 The Last Tomahawk (1965) - Colonel Munroe
 Code Name: Jaguar (1965) - Vassili Golochenko
 Duel at Sundown (1965) - Pastor
 The Desperado Trail (1965) - Gouverneur
 Creature with the Blue Hand (1967) - Dr. Albert Mangrove
 The Blood Demon (1967) - Anatol
  (1967) - Arne
 Death in the Red Jaguar (1968) - Dr. Saunders
 Perrak (1970) - Police President
 The Priest of St. Pauli (1970) - Monsignore
 Holidays in Tyrol (1971) - Konsul Kersten
 The Captain (1971) - Victor Anderson
 Cry of the Black Wolves (1972) - Nicholas Morse
 Hubertus Castle (1973) - Graf Egge
  (1975, TV Mini-Series) - Graf Barby
 Derrick (1977, Season 4, Episode 3: "Eine Nacht im Oktober") - Prosecutor Dr. Meyers
 Die Buddenbrooks (1979, TV Mini-Series) - Leberecht Kröger
 Derrick (1984, Season 11, Episode 3: "Manuels Pfleger") - Herr Färber

References

External links

1909 births
1999 deaths
German male film actors
German male television actors
People from Flensburg
20th-century German male actors